Fusarium merismoides is a fungal plant pathogen.

See also
 List of maize diseases
 List of Platanus diseases

References

External links

merismoides
Fungal tree pathogens and diseases
Maize diseases
Fungi described in 1838